was a  after Bunryaku and before Ryakunin. This period spanned the years from September 1235 to November 1238.

Change of era
 1235 :  The era name was changed to mark an event or a number of events. The previous era ended and a new one commenced in Bunryaku 2.

Events of the Katei Era
 1235 (Katei 1, 11th month): Kujō Yoritsune is raised to the second rank of the second class in the court hierarchy (the dōjō kuge).
 1236 (Katei 2, 7th month): Yoritsune is raised to the first rank of the second class in the dōjō kuge.
 1237 (Katei 3, 8th month): Yoritsune ordered the building of a mansion in the Rokuhara section of Kyoto.

Notes

References
 Nussbaum, Louis-Frédéric and Käthe Roth. (2005).  Japan encyclopedia. Cambridge: Harvard University Press. ;  OCLC 58053128
 Titsingh, Isaac. (1834). Nihon Odai Ichiran; ou,  Annales des empereurs du Japon.  Paris: Royal Asiatic Society, Oriental Translation Fund of Great Britain and Ireland. OCLC 5850691
 Varley, H. Paul. (1980). A Chronicle of Gods and Sovereigns: Jinnō Shōtōki of Kitabatake Chikafusa. New York: Columbia University Press. ;  OCLC 6042764

External links
 National Diet Library, "The Japanese Calendar" -- historical overview plus illustrative images from library's collection

Japanese eras
1230s in Japan